Mistmare is a 2003 action role-playing game from Arxel Tribe set in an alternate medieval Europe. It follows the adventures of a member of the Inquisition who is trying to stop the spread of a deadly magical fog that haunts the land. The game is known for its various bugs and high difficulty. It was one of only three games to receive a zero-star review in the Computer Gaming World magazine, along with Postal 2 and Dungeon Lords.

External links

Role-playing video games
Action role-playing video games
Video games developed in Slovenia
Windows games
Windows-only games
2003 video games
Strategy First games

North America-exclusive video games
Single-player video games
Arxel Tribe games